Beatriz Thibaudin (Buenos Aires, August 9, 1927 – Buenos Aires, February 7, 2007) was an Argentine film, stage, and television actress. She studied drama with Luis Gutman, Lito Cruz, and Augusto Fernandez, as well as body language, classical dance, American dance and singing. In her youth, she practiced horseback riding.

Filmography

Movies

Short films

Television

Miniseries 
 De los Apeninos a los Andes
 Marie Galanté

Awards
 2004, Argentine Film Critics Association Awards: Silver Condor, Best Supporting Actress (Mejor Actriz de Reparto)

External links

1927 births
2007 deaths
People from Buenos Aires
Argentine film actresses
Argentine stage actresses
Argentine television actresses